Michael Wynne is an Olivier Award winning playwright and screenwriter.

Early life 

Wynne was born in Birkenhead, Merseyside. He attended St Peter's Primary School and St Benedict's Secondary School. He studied Politics at Queen Mary College, University of London.

Career 
Wynne wrote his first play The Knocky in his final year at University. It was produced by the Royal Court Theatre, taken on tour and subsequently performed at Liverpool's Everyman Theatre. It won the Meyer Whitworth Award, Best New Talent - Liverpool Echo Arts Awards and he was nominated as Best New Writer by the Writers Guild. Wynne has had six plays produced by the Royal Court - The Knocky, The People Are Friendly, The Priory, The Red Flag, Friday Night Sex (co-written and directed with Alecky Blythe) and Who Cares. The Priory won the Olivier Award for Best New Comedy. He has worked with four Royal Court artistic directors - Steven Daldry, Ian Rickson, Dominic Cooke and Vicky Featherstone.

Other plays include Sell Out and Dirty Wonderland for Frantic Assembly. The Boy Who Left Home for Actors Touring Company/Lyric Theatre Hammersmith. Tits/Teeth for the National Youth Theatre and Soho Theatre. Canvas for the Minerva Theatre, Chichester.

Wynne wrote Too Cold For Snow for Prada at the Prada Foundation in Milan. It starred Cillian Murphy, Kelly Reilly, Rupert Penry-Jones, Hans Matheson, Paul Fox and was directed by Vicky Featherstone. He took part in the very first 24 Hour Plays at the Old Vic Theatre and wrote Cuba which starred Penelope Wilton, Harriet Walter, Alex Jennings and Susan Lynch and closed the night. He wrote and directed the play/film Collider about CERN, The Large Hadron Collider and the search for the Higgs Boson for the Science Museum, London and subsequent world tour.

Wynne wrote Hope Place for the Everyman Theatre, Liverpool. It was the first new play to be performed in the newly rebuilt Everyman Theatre and is the Everyman Theatre's best selling new play to date. He also wrote The Star for the Liverpool Playhouse, to celebrate the 150th anniversary of the Playhouse Theatre which was originally The Star Music Hall.

Wynne co-wrote the film My Summer of Love (in collaboration with Pawel Pawlikowski) which starred Emily Blunt and Natalie Press. It won the BAFTA for Best British Film and Best Screenplay - Evening Standard Awards.

He has written extensively for television including Where The Heart Is, Grafters, As If, Sugar Rush and Eyes Down. He wrote the film Lapland for BBC1 and was shown on Christmas Eve  in 2011 as part of the BBC1 Christmas schedule. It starred Sue Johnston, Steven Graham, Elizabeth Berrington, Julie Graham, William Ash and Zawe Ashton. He subsequently wrote the six part spin off series Being Eileen for BBC1.

He wrote The Daltons/Little Crackers starring Sheridan Smith about Sheridan's childhood for Sky Tv.

He is currently under commission to the National Theatre, Liverpool Everyman and Sheffield Crucible.

Wynne's plays are published by Faber and Faber.

Wynne has been writer on attachment at the Royal Court Theatre and National Theatre. He has led many playwriting groups and workshops, both nationally and internationally – Mexico, Ghana, Australia, United States  (UCLA and Stanford). He was the Senior Playwright Tutor on the MA Creative Writing: Playwriting at Salford University working with students and writers from the Liverpool Everyman, Manchester Royal Exchange and Bolton Octagon.

Plays include: 
 The Knocky – The Royal Court Theatre
 The Boy Who Left Home – Lyric Theatre, Hammersmith
 Sell Out – Frantic Assembly
 Too Cold For Snow – The Prada Foundation
 The People Are Friendly – The Royal Court Theatre
 Dirty Wonderland – Frantic Assembly
 Tits/Teeth – Soho Theatre
 The Priory – The Royal Court Theatre
 The Red Flag – The Royal Court Theatre
 Canvas – Minerva Theatre, Chichester
 Friday Night Sex (co written with Alecky Blythe) - The Royal Court Theatre
 Hope Place- Everyman Theatre, Liverpool
 Who Cares - The Royal Court Theatre
 The Star - Liverpool Playhouse

 Television includes:
 Where The Heart Is - ITV
 Grafters - ITV
 As If - Channel 4
 UGetMe - BBC1
 Substance - BBC3
 Don't Eat The Neighbours - ITV
 Eyes Down - BBC1
 The Catherine Tate Show - BBC2
 Sugar Rush - Channel 4 
 Mayo - BBC1
 EastEnders - BBC1
 Lapland/Being Eileen - BBC1
 The Daltons - Sky
 Being Eileen - BBC1

Awards include:
 Meyer Whitworth Award- Best New Playwright The Knocky
 Best New Talent - Liverpool Echo Arts Awards - The Knocky
 Best New Writer Nomination - Writers Guild - The Knocky
 Best Off West End Play - Time Out Theatre Awards - Sell Out
 Best New Comedy Nomination - Whatsonstage Awards - The People Are Friendly
 BAFTA Best British Film - My Summer of Love
 Best Screenplay - Evening Standard Film Awards - My Summer of Love
 Michael Powell Award for Best British Film at the Edinburgh Film Festival - My Summer of Love
 Best New Comedy Nomination - Whatsonstage Awards - The Priory
 Olivier Award - Best New Comedy - The Priory

References

British dramatists and playwrights
Living people
People from Birkenhead
British male dramatists and playwrights
Year of birth missing (living people)